This is a list of women artists who were born in Switzerland or whose artworks are closely associated with that country.

A more comprehensive list of Swiss women artists can be found in the SIKART Lexicon on art in Switzerland of the Swiss Institute for Art Research (SIK-ISEA).

A
Anna Maria Barbara Abesch (1706–1773), reverse glass painter
Eva Aeppli (1925–2015), painter, sculptor
Albertine (born 1967), illustrator, mainly of children's books

B
Alice Bailly (1872–1938), Cubist painter
Marie-Claire Baldenweg (born 1954), contemporary artist
Fabiana de Barros (born 1957), Brazilian-Swiss contemporary artist
Maria Cecilia Adelaide Bass (1897–1948), painter
Ursula Biemann (born 1955), video artist
Hélène Binet (born 1959), architectural photographer
Alice Boner (1889–1981), painter, sculptor, historian
Sonam Dolma Brauen (born 1953), Tibetan-Swiss contemporary painter and sculptor
Louise Catherine Breslau (1856–1927), German-born Swiss painter, pastelist and printmaker
Mauren Brodbeck (born 1974), photographer
Henriette Brossin de Polanska (1878–1954), painter
Heidi Bucher (1926–1993), sculptor
Jenny Burckhardt (1849–1935), painter
Martha Burkhardt (1874–1956), painter and photographer

C
Miriam Cahn (born 1949), painter
Claudia Christen (born 1973), designer and photographer
Aloïse Corbaz (1886–1964), outsider artist
Louise de Corcelles (1726–1796), amateur artist
Corinne Cuéllar-Nathan (born 1958), landscape painter
Martha Cunz (1876–1961), printmaker, lithographer
Marie-Antoinette Chiarenza (born 1957), member of the artist collective RELAX (chiarenza & hauser & co), contextual artist

D
Adèle d'Affry (1836–1879), artist and sculptor
Helen Dahm (1878–1968), expressionist artist
Silvie Defraoui (born 1935), visual artist
Dr. Gindi (born 1965), sculptor

E
Ulla Engeberg Killias (1945–1995), Swedish-born Swiss painter

F
Janika Fabrikant (born 1934), French-born Swiss Surrealist industrial painter
Valérie Favre (born 1959), painter
Marie Ferrier-Perregaux (1777–1838), painter
Sylvie Fleury (born 1961), pop artist
Annemie Fontana (1925–2002), sculptor, painter
Pia Fries (born 1955), painter
Anna Füssli (1749–1772), painter

G
Babeli Giezendanner (1831–1905), painter
Alwina Gossauer (1841–1926), photographer
Henriette Grindat (1923–1986), photographer
Françoise Grossen (born 1943), textile artist
Maria Gugelberg von Moos (1836–1918), botanist and floral artist
Alis Guggenheim (1896–1958), painter, sculptor

H
Andrea Hasler (born 1975), contemporary artist
Christine Hiebert (born 1960), artist known for her drawing
Beatrice Helg (born 1956), photographer
Maria Herrmann-Kaufmann (1921–2008), painter
Olivia Heussler (born 1957), photographer
Susette Hirzel (1769–1858), painter
Britta Huttenlocher (born 1962)
Heidrun Huwyler (born 1942), German-Swiss Impressionist painter

K
Angelica Kauffman (1741–1807), Neoclassical painter
Elisabetta Keller (1891–1969), painter and pastelist
Emma Kunz (1892–1963), visual artist

L
Rosa Lachenmeier (born 1959), contemporary artist
Warja Lavater (1913–2007), designer, illustrator
Louise-Émilie Leleux-Giraud (1824–1885), painter active in France
Catherine Leutenegger (born 1983), visual artist
Henriette L'Hardy (1766–1808), painter
Verena Loewensberg (1912–1986), painter, graphic designer
Jeanne Lombard (1865–1945), painter
Ingeborg Lüscher (born 1936), artist, working with painting, sculpture, photography, installation and video

M
Ella Maillart (1903–1997), adventurer, travel writer and photographer
Brigitta Malche (born 1938), painter and installation artist
Maria Marshall (born 1966), visual artist
Annemarie von Matt (1905–1967), painter, graphic artist and writer
Elvezia Michel-Baldini (1887–1963), painter and illustrator
Pierrette Micheloud (1915–2007), writer and painter
Mascha Mioni (born 1941), painter and textile artist
Alina Mnatsakanian (born 1958), visual artist 
Milo Moiré (born 1983), conceptual artist
Franziska Möllinger (1817–1880), pioneering German-born Swiss photographer
Karin Muller (born 1965), writer, filmmaker and photographer

N
Caro Niederer (born 1963), contemporary artist
Marguerite Naville (1852–1930), painter, illustrator and photographer

O
Méret Oppenheim (1913–1985), German-born Swiss Surrealist artist
Armande Oswald (born 1940), painter, scenographer

P
Leta Peer (1964–2012), painter and photographer
Sibylle Pasche (born 1976), sculptor
Valentine Pasche (born 1979), comics artist
Mai-Thu Perret (born 1976), Swiss artist of Franco-Vietnamese origin

R
Marthe Rakine (1904–1996), Canadian-Swiss painter
Clara von Rappard (1857–1912), painter
Pipilotti Rist (born 1962), visual artist
Ottilie Roederstein (1859–1937), German-Swiss painter
Pamela Rosenkranz (born 1979), contemporary artist
Annina Ruest (fl. 2000–), contemporary artist, academic

S
Jeanne-Pernette Schenker-Massot (1761–1828), miniaturist, pastelist and engraver
Julieta Schildknecht (born 1960), Swiss-Brazilian photographer and journalist
Erna Schillig (1900–1993), textile artist, mosaic and plaster muralist 
Anka Schmid (born 1961), film director and video artist
Renée Schwarzenbach-Wille (1883–1959), photographer, diarist
Annemarie Schwarzenbach (1908–1942), writer, photographer and traveller 
Christine Sefolosha (born 1955), painter
Sonia Sekula (1918–1963), expressionist artist 
Caroline Sophie Sordet-Boissonnas (1859–1943), painter
Anita Spinelli (1908–2010), painter, drawer 
Annie Stebler-Hopf (1861–1918), painter
Monika Steiner (born 1972), Swiss-born American artist and sculptor
Martha Stettler (1870–1945), painter, engraver
Marianne Straub (1909–1994), textile designer

T
Sophie Taeuber-Arp (1889–1943), painter, sculptor, textile designer
Elisabeth Terroux (1759–1822), painter 
Myriam Thyes (born 1963), Luxembourg-born Swiss media artist
Miriam Tinguely (born 1950), painter and engraver
Anna Maria Tobler (1882–1935), painter
Anne Marie Trechslin (1927–2007), Italian-born Swiss painter, engraver and illustrator
Natasha Tsakos (fl. 2000–), performance artist
Lill Tschudi (1911–2004), linocut printmaker

V
Annie Vallotton (1915–2013), Bible illustrator
Denise Voïta (1928–2008), painter, lithographer and tapestry designer

W
Isabelle Waldberg (1911–1990), sculptor
Anna Waser (1678–1714), painter
Charlotte Weiss (1870–1961), painter
Lisa Wenger (1858–1941), painter and children's writer
Marianne von Werefkin (1860–1938), Russian-Swiss Expressionist painter

Z
Albertine Zullo (born 1967), children's book illustrator

-
Swiss
Artists, women
Artists